Ink Master: Angels is a spin-off of the tattoo reality competition Ink Master that premiered on October 3, 2017 on the Paramount Network. The series follows season 8 competitors Ryan Ashley Malarkey, who won that season, Kelly Doty, Gia Rose, and Nikki Simpson as they travel around the nation going head-to-head with some of the country's top local artists who are competing to earn a spot on a future season of Ink Master.

Overview
Three local artists compete with one being eliminated in each round. The first round served as a two-hour elimination tattoo where the artists must tattoo a body part in the style and subject of their choice in order to impress the Angels. For round two, two artists had four hours to tattoo a subject the city's known for. Originally, Season 1 featured the local artist picked the Angel they want to face on the day of the face off. But starting with Season 2, it is revealed that the winner of the second round will face a random Angel. The Angel and the local artist will then draw white skulls that will determine who gets one of the two human canvases before the six hour process begins where they have to tattoo a subject inspired by a certain theme in the human canvas and or city. The Angels, the eliminated local artists, and the audience each get one vote following the conclusion of the tattooing. And if the local artist gets the most votes and successfully takes down an Angel, they will earn a spot on Ink Master.

Production
On June 5, 2017, Spike ordered a second Ink Master spin-off focusing on Season 8's female competitors which includes winner Ryan Ashley Malarkey, and finalists Kelly Doty, Nikki Simpson and Gia Rose. A 10-episode second season was commissioned on November 17, 2017 that aired on March 27, 2018 on Spike's rebranded channel Paramount Network. However, Rose did not return for the second season, leaving just the trio of Malarkey, Doty, and Simpson.

Cast

Judges
 Ryan Ashley Malarkey
 Kelly Doty
 Gia Rose (season 1)
 Nikki Simpson

Special appearances
Former Ink Master competitors who appeared in episodes.

Season 1

Episode 1
 DJ Tambe, co-winner of Ink Master (with Bubba Irwin) season 9, and, coach (of contestant Josh Payne) and master challenge winner of season 10
 Joey Hamilton, winner of season 3
 Cleen Rock One, runner-up on season 5 and season 7, and contestant on season 9
 Noelin Wheeler, contestant on season 9
 Big Ceeze, contestant on season 6

Episode 3
 Tatu Baby, contestant on Ink Master season 2 and season 3

Episode 8
 Sarah Miller, runner-up on Ink Master season 2 and contestant on season 7

Season 2

Episode 2
 Sarah Miller, runner-up on Ink Master season 2 and contestant on season 7

Episode 4
 Katie McGowan, contestant on Ink Master season 6 and runner-up on season 9
 Matt O'Baugh, contestant on season 6 and runner-up on season 9

Episode 5
 Frank Ready, contestant on Ink Master season 10

Episode 6
 Daniel Silva, contestant on Ink Master season 10

Episode 8
 Duffy Fortner, contestant on Ink Master season 6

Episode 9
 Bubba Irwin, contestant on Ink Master season 4 and co-winner of season 9 (with DJ Tambe)
 Tatu Baby, contestant on season 2 and season 3

Episode 10
 Megan Jean Morris, contestant on Ink Master season 7

Episodes

Series overview

Season 1 (2017)
The contestants competed to earn a spot on Ink Master: Return of the Masters.

Season 2 (2018)
The contestants competed to earn a spot on Ink Master: Grudge Match – Cleen vs. Christian. Gia Rose did not return for the second season.

References

External links
 
Kelly Doty: Ink Master
 

2010s American reality television series
2017 American television series debuts
2018 American television series endings
English-language television shows
Spike (TV network) original programming
Ink Master
Tattooing television series
Paramount Network original programming
American television spin-offs